Donna Cruz Yrastorza-Larrazabal (born February 14, 1977), professionally known as Donna Cruz, is a Filipina singer and actress. She is a member of the Philippine showbiz family Cruz.

Her self-titled debut album Donna was well received by the general public and earned her a double platinum certification. Cruz's fourth studio album Habang May Buhay earned a certification of four-times platinum six months after its release. Its lead single "Only Me and You" became a radio hit in the Philippines during the summer of 1995. In December 1995, Cruz won Best Actress in a Supporting Role in the 1995 Metro Manila Film Festival for her portrayal as Noemi in the movie Muling Umawit ang Puso. In 1996, Cruz starred in DoReMi, while she also released Merry Christmas Donna. In 1997, Cruz released Pure Donna which was certified three times platinum in 1998. Cruz had official PARI certifications for all her studio albums releases from 1989 up to her hiatus in 2000.

Cruz returned to the music industry with the release of her eighth studio album Now and Forever under Star Music in 2016.

Biography

1988–1991: Early career beginnings and Donna

She was born on February 14 in Manila, Philippines. As a child, Cruz joined pageants and singing competitions. Her first stint in showbiz was when she ended up as a grand finalist of Eat Bulaga!'''s Little Miss Philippines child beauty pageant. Her biggest break up to that point was her achievement of becoming a grand champion of Bulilit Kampeon in 1988. She signed with Viva Records in 1989 and released her debut album Donna in 1991. Her original single "Kapag Tumibok ang Puso" and her cover of Boy Mondragon's Rain became popular singles in OPM music. Cruz recorded all the songs at the age of 14, making her the youngest artist from Viva Records to ever record a full studio album. The album was very successful and earned a double platinum certification, making her the youngest artist to ever reach platinum in the Philippines.

1992–1994: Kurot sa Puso, Langit Na Naman and breakthrough as an actress

In 1992, Cruz won as Best New Performing Artist in Awit Awards, and joined German Moreno's That's Entertainment, a daily variety show that featured young and upcoming new talents. She released Kurot sa Puso in early 1993 and later that year starred in the movie Kadenang Bulaklak alongside Vina Morales, Ana Roces, Angelu de Leon and Nida Blanca. She became part of the sitcoms Alabang Girls and Ober Da Bakod, both produced by VIVA Entertainment Group. In 1994, she released Langit Na Naman, her third studio album. It was certified gold in the Philippines. It was in that same year that she starred in another drama produced by Viva, Pangako Ng Kahapon, together with Agot Isidro, Alice Dixson and Charito Solis which gave Cruz her first Best Supporting Actress nomination.

1995–1996: Habang May Buhay and dominance in the entertainment industry

After a string of successful movies, Viva Entertainment Group gave Cruz her first soap opera entitled Villa Quintana in 1995, opposite actor Keempee de Leon. She also starred in college romance flicks such as Campus Girls, Okey Si Ma'am, and Love Notes: The Movie. As a recording artist, she launched her signature album, Habang May Buhay, an album composed of love songs. The album received a quadruple platinum award, becoming Cruz's best-selling album so far. The single "Only Me and You" was chosen as Awit Award's Best Ballad Recording in 1995, and Cruz won the award for Best Ballad Performance by a Female Vocalist. Before the year closed, Cruz joined actress Nora Aunor in the drama film, Muling Umawit ang Puso, in which she won her first acting award, a Best Supporting Actress trophy given by the Metro Manila Film Festival. Cruz was only eighteen when she won the coveted recognition making her the youngest recipient of the award until then sixteen-year-old actress Rebecca Lusterio won the award in 2004.

In 1996, her second single "Habang May Buhay" was released as a tie-in with a romantic movie of the same name. Habang May Buhay was top-billed by Cruz, Ian de Leon, Candy Pangilinan and veteran actress Hilda Koronel. She also starred alongside Bong Revilla and Nanette Medved in the action romantic-comedy movie, Pag-Ibig Ko sa Iyo'y Totoo. Cruz recorded a duet with American singer Jason Everly, called "Wish", son of Phil Everly of the Everly Brothers which became the biggest radio single of 1996. Later that year, Cruz starred in DoReMi, the biggest movie of 1996, together with Regine Velasquez and Mikee Cojuangco. By the end of 1996, Cruz became the most popular female recording artist in the OPM music scene, having earned platinum and gold certifications for her first four albums. After releasing music that mostly had themes about love, Cruz released the holiday record Merry Christmas Donna which included the single "Muling Sumapit ang Pasko," written by Cruz's longtime collaborator Vehnee Saturno. The album was certified platinum, and became the biggest-selling Christmas album during that year.

1997–1998: Pure Donna and career milestones

In 1997, Cruz starred in Dahil Tanging Ikaw alongside Ian de Leon and Jao Mapa. Her album Pure Donna was also released and garnered platinum status in just a week after it was issued in record outlets. Cruz also starred and hosted her musical special Pure Donna, which was broadcast on GMA 7 on her twentieth birthday. The special won the Best Musical Special in the 1997 Aliw Awards. Later that year, Cruz reunited with Jason Everly to star in the romantic-comedy film, Isang Tanong, Isang Sagot, which is her latest film to date. Also that same year, she joined Eat Bulaga! as a co-host and performer. She was also part of SOP, a Sunday musical variety show. A Villa Quintana: The Movie starring Cruz and Keempee de Leon was also planned but was scrapped by Viva Films at the last minute.

Before the year ended, Cruz was officially the highest-paid female celebrity in the 1990s, with annual earnings worth ₱77 million in 1997 alone, according to Viva Entertainment.

In 1998, she was supposed to film Putikang Anghel a movie which will depict Cruz in a daring role, with Onemig Bondoc and Jake Roxas, but production was halted after Vic del Rosario Jr., owner of Viva Entertainment, Inc. rejected the script. Cruz's final project before her marriage in September 1998 was in Growing Up in which she voluntarily decided to play a supporting role to actress Angelu de Leon instead of starring co-lead. Cruz eventually dropped out of the show and married ophthalmologist Potenciano Larrazabal III and relocated to Cebu permanently. A compilation named The Best of Donna was released to commemorate Cruz's ten year catalog with Viva Entertainment from 1989–1998.

1999–2004: Hulog Ng Langit and career hiatus

Cruz released her final album under Viva Records in 1999, entitled "Hulog ng Langit", which focused on love songs and lullabies. At age 22, she gave birth to a daughter named Isabella Adriana. After giving birth, she released "Ikaw Pala 'Yon" her final single under her then-current contract with Viva Entertainment Group. 

In 2001, Viva Records released Donna Cruz Sings Her Greatest Hits and in November of that same year, she performed at the Philippine Advertising Congress Awards held in Cebu. After finishing her contract with Viva, she was able to graduate with degree in Bachelor of Science in Computer Science in Cebu Doctors University. In 2003, she gave birth to a son named Potenciano IV. Cruz made a special guest appearance in Bahay Mo Ba 'To? as Lynnette, reprising her role in Villa Quintana in 2004.

2005–2014: Television appearances and guestings
Cruz returned to the spotlight in 2005, after appearing with her two children, Belle and Cian, for a Jollibee commercial. In that same year, Cruz sang the Pampers Christmas jingle "Payapang Daigdig". In 2008, Cruz spearheaded Lactum's 100% Panatag Ako campaign by singing "Kailanma'y Panatag", a song written by Ogie Alcasid and Nicole Tolentino, and performed the song in ASAP.

In 2010, Cruz appeared as a celebrity contestant in Wowowee, and performed "I Can" with fellow celebrity contestants Dimples Romana and Nikki Valdez. A year later, Cruz appeared in the sitcom Daldalita with Ogie Alcasid and Manilyn Reynes where she played the role of Daldalita's mother. This marked Cruz's first acting role in a television show since 1998's Growing Up. In that same year, Cruz performed on stage in GMA 7's Party Pilipinas singing her hit single, "Rain".

2015–present: Now and Forever and return to the entertainment industry

In 2015, Cruz sang the Similac Gain School theme song, "Wonderful World". Months later, Cruz returned to the music scene signing her comeback album under Star Music in January 2016. She appeared on Tonight with Boy Abunda, Kris TV and ASAP Natin 'To to promote her latest album, Now and Forever.

Personal life
Donna Cruz Yrastorza was born on February 14, 1977, to parents Renato Yrastorza and Yolly Cruz. She has an older brother named Jomar. In February 1998, Cruz became engaged to Potenciano "Yong" Larrazabal III, an ophthalmologist from Cebu. She married Larrazabal on September 19, 1998, in Manila before moving to Cebu permanently. She and Larrazabal have three children named Isabella Adriana nicknamed "Belle" (born October 27, 1999), Potenciano IV nicknamed "Cian" (born August 3, 2003) and Iñigo Renato nicknamed "Gio" (born May 25, 2007).

Discography
Cruz has released eight studio albums, two soundtrack albums and three compilation albums. Cruz has sold over 2,500,000 units of her albums from 1991-2000 under Viva Records, making her the biggest-selling female artist of OPM music in the nineties. In 2016, she was officially signed as a recording artist under Star Music, marking her comeback in the OPM music scene.

Studio albumsDonna (1991)Kurot sa Puso (1993)Langit Na Naman (1994)Habang May Buhay (1995)Merry Christmas Donna (1996)Pure Donna (1997)Hulog ng Langit (1999)Now and Forever (2016)

Soundtrack albumsCampus Girls: Music from the Motion Picture (1995)Love Notes - The Movie: Music from the Motion Picture (1995)Muling Umawit Ang Puso: Music from the Motion Picture (1995)DoReMi: Music from the Motion Picture (1996)

Compilation albumsThe Best of Donna (1998)Donna Cruz Sings Her Greatest Hits (2001)Silver Series: Donna (2006)

Filmography
Television

Film

Awards
Awit Awards

|-
| 1992 || Herself || Best New Female Recording Artist|| 
|-
| 1995 || "Only Me and You" || Best Ballad Recording || 
|-

Film Academy of the Philippines

|-
| 1994 || Pangako ng Kahapon || Best Supporting Actress|| 
|-

Star Awards

|-
| 1994 || Pangako ng Kahapon || Best Supporting Actress|| 
|-

Metro Manila Film Festival

|-
| 1995 || Muling Umawit ang Puso || Best Supporting Actress|| 
|-

Aliw Awards

|-
| 1997 || Pure Donna'' || Best Musical Special|| 
|-

References

External links
Official Website

Living people
21st-century Filipino singers
21st-century Filipino women singers
Actresses from Manila
Donna
Filipino child actresses
Filipino child singers
Filipino film actresses
Filipino television actresses
Filipino women comedians
People from Cebu City
Singers from Manila
That's Entertainment (Philippine TV series)
That's Entertainment Tuesday Group Members
GMA Network personalities
Star Music artists
Viva Records (Philippines) artists
1977 births